Joe McAndrew may refer to:

Joe McAndrew (rally driver), a New Zealand rally driver
Joe McAndrew (politician), a member of the Pennsylvania House of Representatives